Sauder is a surname. Notable people with the surname include:

 Erie J. Sauder (1904–1997), American inventor and furniture-maker
 Sauder Woodworking Company
 Lloyd Sauder (born 1950), Canadian politician
 Luke Sauder (born 1970), Canadian alpine skier
 Peter Sauder, Canadian film and TV writer, television producer and animator
 Theo Sauder (born 1996), Canadian rugby player 
 William Sauder (1926–2007), Canadian industrialist
UBC Sauder School of Business, endowed by William Sauder

See also